Bristol County is a county in the Commonwealth of Massachusetts. As of the 2020 census, the population was 579,200. The shire town is Taunton. Some governmental functions are performed by the Commonwealth of Massachusetts, others by the county, and others by local towns and cities. 

Bristol County is part of the Providence-Warwick, RI-MA Metropolitan Statistical Area, which is also included in the Boston-Worcester-Providence, MA-RI-NH-CT Combined Statistical Area. The county is adjacent to the state of Rhode Island. It is geographically adjacent to the Massachusetts counties of Plymouth, Norfolk, and Dukes (via water), and the Rhode Island counties of Bristol, Newport, and Providence.

History

Bristol County was created by the Plymouth Colony on June 2, 1685, and named after its "shire town" (county seat), Bristol.  The Plymouth Colony, along with the Massachusetts Bay Colony, the Maine Colony and several other small settlements were rechartered in 1691, by King William III, to become The Province of Massachusetts Bay.

The towns of Bristol, Barrington, and Warren were awarded to Rhode Island in 1746 as part of the settlement of a long-running boundary dispute (see History of Massachusetts), forming Bristol County, Rhode Island.  At the same time, Cumberland, Rhode Island was carved out of Attleborough, Massachusetts and annexed to Providence County, Rhode Island; Tiverton and Little Compton were transferred to Newport County, Rhode Island.  East Freetown was officially purchased by Freetown, Massachusetts, from Tiverton in 1747, and so remained on the Massachusetts side.

After the departure of Bristol, Taunton was made the shire town of the county.  A second county courthouse was constructed in 1828 in the growing town of New Bedford (designed a "half-shire town").  In 1862, a part of Seekonk (that portion of which is now East Providence, Rhode Island) and the entirety of East Pawtucket were transferred to Providence County, Rhode Island.  At the same time, land ceded from Rhode Island was added to Fall River and Westport.  The growing Fall River became the site of the third county courthouse in 1877.

Geography
It is also to note that Bristol, Plymouth and Taunton are all places in South West England. Their Massachusetts cousins were named after the originals as South West England was the focal point for sailing and discovery at the time of America's discovery. John Cabot set sail from Bristol and sailed down the Severn on which lies Newport in Wales.

Adjacent counties
 Norfolk County, Massachusetts—north
 Plymouth County, Massachusetts—east
 Newport County, Rhode Island—southwest
 Bristol County, Rhode Island—west
 Providence County, Rhode Island—northwest

To the south, Dukes County, Massachusetts is opposite Buzzards Bay from Bristol County.

National protected area
 New Bedford Whaling National Historical Park

Demographics

2000 census
At the 2000 census there were 534,678 people, 205,411 households, and 140,706 families in the county. The racial makeup of the county was 90.98% White, 2.03% Black or African American, 0.24% Native American, 1.26% Asian, 0.03% Pacific Islander, 3.12% from other races, and 2.34% from two or more races. 3.60% was Hispanic or Latino of any race. 29.7% were of Portuguese, 13.0% Irish, 8.9% French, 8.2% English, 6.8% Italian and 6.4% French Canadian ancestry according to Census 2000. 79.1% spoke English, 13.9% Portuguese, 2.9% Spanish and 1.6% French as their first language. The United States Census Bureau reported Bristol County as being one of two counties in the United States with a plurality of people of Portuguese ancestry (the other being the contiguous Bristol County, Rhode Island).

Of the 205,411 households 33.00% had children under the age of 18 living with them, 51.60% were married couples living together, 13.00% had a female householder with no husband present, and 31.50% were non-families. Of all households 26.50% were one person and 11.00% were one person aged 65 or older. The average household size was 2.54 and the average family size was 3.08.

The age distribution was 24.60% under the age of 18, 8.50% from 18 to 24, 30.50% from 25 to 44, 22.20% from 45 to 64, and 14.10% 65 or older. The median age was 37 years. For every 100 females, there were 92.40 males. For every 100 females age 18 and over, there were 88.50 males.

The median household income was $43,496 and the median family income  was $53,733. Males had a median income of $39,361 versus $27,516 for females. The per capita income for the county was $20,978. About 7.80% of families and 10.00% of the population were below the poverty line, including 13.00% of those under age 18 and 12.00% of that age 65 or over.

2010 census
At the 2010 census, there were 548,285 people, 213,010 households, and 141,338 families in the county. The racial makeup of the county was 88.4% white, 3.3% black, 1.9% Asian, 0.4% American Indian, 3.4% from other races, and 2.6% from two or more races. Those of Hispanic or Latino origin made up 6.0% of the population. The largest ancestry groups were:

 30.1% Portuguese
 19.2% Irish
 13.1% French
 12.5% English
 9.3% Italian
 5.7% French Canadian
 5.0% German
 4.5% Polish
 3.4% Puerto Rican
 3.3% Sub-Saharan African
 2.5% American
 2.0% Scottish
 1.4% Swedish
 1.3% Scotch-Irish
 1.0% Arab

Of the 213,010 households, 32.6% had children under the age of 18 living with them, 47.5% were married couples living together, 14.0% had a female householder with no husband present, 33.6% were non-families, and 27.4% of households were made up of individuals. The average household size was 2.50 and the average family size was 3.06. The median age was 39.8 years.

The median household income was $54,955 and the median family income  was $70,161. Males had a median income of $51,785 versus $39,714 for females. The per capita income for the county was $27,736. About 8.8% of families and 11.3% of the population were below the poverty line, including 15.7% of those under age 18 and 10.4% of those age 65 or over.

Income breakdown by town

The ranking of unincorporated communities that are included on the list are reflective if the census designated locations and villages were included as cities or towns. Data is from the 2007-2011 American Community Survey 5-Year Estimates.

Politics and government

Bristol County has voted for the presidential nominee of the Democratic Party in every election since 1960.

|}

 Paul B. Kitchen—County Commissioner
 John R. Mitchell—County Commissioner
 John T. Saunders—County Commissioner
 Thomas M. Quinn, III—District Attorney
 Thomas M. Hodgson—Sheriff
 Christopher T. Saunders—County Treasurer
 Barry Amaral—Register of Deeds, Northern District
 Bernard McDonald—Register of Deeds, Fall River District
 Frederick M. Kalisz—Register of Deeds, Southern District
 Marc Santos—Clerk of Courts

The Bristol County Sheriff's Office maintains its administrative headquarters and operates several jail facilities in the Dartmouth Complex in North Dartmouth in Dartmouth. Jail facilities in the Dartmouth Complex include the Bristol County House Of Correction and Jail, the Bristol County Sheriff's Office Women's Center, and the C. Carlos Carreiro Immigration Detention Center. The office also operates the Ash Street Jail and Regional Lock-Up and the Juvenile Secure Alternative Lock Up Program (JALP) in New Bedford.

The Bristol County House Of Correction and Jail has room for 1,100 prisoners. It houses men convicted of crimes who have been sentenced to  years or less. It also houses high-security male pre-trial prisoners, high-security female prisoners, and pre-trial female prisoners.

The women's center, a medium security jail, can house up to 106 women. The self-contained women's center had opened as a minimum security pre-release center for male prisoners in 1990 which could house up to 106 prisoners. When it was a pre-release facility it only housed an average of 60 prisoners because the county sheriff imposed strict conditions upon the pre-release program. In 1999 the sheriff received a federal grant to convert the pre-release center into a women's center, and he moved the pre-release program to modular units at the main jail.

The Carreiro jail houses detained individuals who are scheduled for deportation and individuals who are engaging in proceedings with the Immigration and Customs Enforcement (ICE). The Ash Street jail houses over 200 pre-trial prisoners and a few sentenced inmate workers for the system. JALP houses up to 12 pre-arraingment juvenile prisoners.

Twin town 
The county is twinned with the municipality of Lagoa in the Azores.

Transportation
Transportation authorities providing public bus service include the Greater Attleboro Taunton Regional Transit Authority; and the Southeastern Regional Transit Authority serving the Fall River and New Bedford areas.

Airports include the Mansfield Municipal Airport, Myricks Airport, New Bedford Municipal Airport and  Taunton Municipal Airport; of these, the New Bedford airport is a commercial airport, with flights serving the Cape Cod, Nantucket and Martha's Vineyard area.

The Providence/Stoughton Line of the MBTA commuter rail has stops in Mansfield, Attleboro, and South Attleboro.  The line provides connections to Providence and Boston (at Back Bay Station and South Station), as well as intermediate stops.  An extension has been completed that connects to T. F. Green Airport.

Major highways

Communities

Cities
 Attleboro
 Fall River
 New Bedford
 Taunton (county seat)

Towns

 Acushnet
 Berkley
 Dartmouth
 Dighton
 Easton
 Fairhaven
 Freetown
 Mansfield
 North Attleborough
 Norton
 Raynham
 Rehoboth
 Seekonk
 Somerset
 Swansea
 Westport

Census-designated places

 Acushnet Center
 Bliss Corner
 Mansfield Center
 North Seekonk
 North Westport
 Norton Center
 Ocean Grove
 Raynham Center
 Smith Mills

Other villages

 Assonet
 Bowensville
 Britannia
 East Freetown
 East Taunton
 Fall River Station
 Five Corners
 Flint Village
 Four Corners
 Globe Village
 Gushee Pond
 Highlands
 Hixville
 Hornbine
 Hortonville
 Kingmans Corner
 Myricks
 North Attleborough Center
 North Dighton
 North Easton
 North Raynham
 North Rehoboth
 North Taunton
 Oakland
 Padanaram
 Pecks Corner
 Perrys Corner
 Perryville
 Pleasantfield
 Pleasant Street
 Pottersville
 Prattville
 Ramblewood
 Rehoboth
 Sassaquin
 South Attleboro
 South Rehoboth
 South Easton
 Squawbetty
 Steep Brook
 Titicut
 Tracy Corner
 Wade's Corner
 Weir Village
 Westville
 Whittenton
 Whittenton Junction

Ghost town
 Norton Furnace

Education
School districts include:

K-12:

 Attleboro School District
 Bridgewater-Raynham School District
 Dartmouth School District
 Dighton-Rehoboth School District
 Easton School District
 Fairhaven School District - Takes Acushnet for secondary school
 Fall River School District
 Freetown-Lakeville School District
 Mansfield School District
 New Bedford School District - Takes Acushnet for secondary school
 North Attleborough School District
 Norton School District
 Seekonk School District
 Swansea School District
 Taunton School District
 Westport School District

Secondary:
 Somerset-Berkley School District

Elementary:
 Acushnet School District
 Berkley School District
 Somerset School District

Greater New Bedford Regional Vocational-Technical High School is also in the county.

University of Massachusetts Dartmouth is in the county.

See also

 Administrative divisions of Massachusetts
 Registry of Deeds (Massachusetts)
 Bristol Community College
 Horseneck Beach State Reservation
 Freetown-Fall River State Forest
 National Register of Historic Places listings in Bristol County, Massachusetts
 Southern New England School of Law
 Taunton River
 Taunton River Watershed
 University of Massachusetts Dartmouth
 Wheaton College

References

Further reading
 
 History of Bristol County, Massachusetts with Biographical Sketches of many of its Pioneers and Prominent Men, Part 1 edited by Duane Hamilton Hurd. J.W. Lewis and Co., 1883.  
 
 A history of Bristol County, Massachusetts, Volume 1 by Frank Walcott Hutt.  Lewis Historical Pub. Co., Inc., 1924.

External links

 
 

 
1685 establishments in Massachusetts
Counties of Plymouth Colony
Counties in Greater Boston
Massachusetts counties
Populated places established in 1685
Portuguese-American culture in Massachusetts
Providence metropolitan area